An election was held on November 8, 2016 to elect 25 members to Montana's Senate. The election coincided with elections for other offices, including the Presidency, U.S. House of Representatives, Governorship, and state house. The primary election was held on June 7, 2016.

Results summary

Summary of results by State Senate District

Detailed Results

Districts 2–25

District 2
Incumbent Republican Dee Brown has represented the 2nd district since 2013.

District 3
Incumbent Republican Bruce Tutvedt has represented the 3rd district since 2009. Tutvedt was term-limited and couldn't seek re-election. State Representative Keith Regier won the open seat.

District 6
Incumbent Republican Janna Taylor has represented the 6th district since 2013. Taylor didn't seek re-election. State Representative Albert Olszewski won the open seat.

District 7
Incumbent Republican Jennifer Fielder has represented the 7th district since 2013.

District 10
Incumbent Rick Ripley has represented the 10th district since 2009. Ripley was term-limited and couldn't seek re-election.

District 15
Incumbent Democrat Brad Hamlett has represented the 15th district since 2009. Hamlett was term-limited and he successfully ran for the Montana house. Republican state representative Ryan Osmundson won the open seat.

District 16
Incumbent Democrat Jonathan Windy Boy has represented the 16th district since 2009. Windy Boy was term-limited and he successfully ran for the Montana house. Former state Senator Frank Smith won the open seat.

District 17
Incumbent Republican John Brenden has represented the 17th district since 2009. Brenden was term-limited and couldn't seek re-election.

District 18
Incumbent Republican Matt Rosendale has represented the 18th district since 2013. Rosendale retired and successfully ran for state auditor.

District 21
Incumbent Democrat Sharon Stewart-Peregoy has represented the 21st district since 2009. Stewart-Peregoy was term-limited and she successfully ran for the Montana house.

District 23
Incumbent Republican Roger Webb has represented the 23rd district since 2013.

District 25
Incumbent Democrat Robyn Driscoll has represented the 25th district and its predecessors since 2013. Driscoll didn't seek re-election.

Districts 26–47

District 26
Incumbent Republican Elsie Arntzen has represented the 26th district and its predecessors since 2013. Arntzen retired to run for Montana Superintendent of Public Instruction. Democratic state representative Margaret MacDonald won the open seat.

District 28
Incumbent Republican Taylor Brown has represented the 28th district since 2009. Brown was term-limited and couldn't seek re-election.

District 31
Incumbent Democrat Mike Phillips has represented the 31st district since 2013.

District 35
Incumbent Republican Scott Sales has represented the 35th district and its predecessors since 2013.

District 36
Incumbent Republican Senate President Debby Barrett has represented the 36th district since 2009. Barrett was term-limited and couldn't seek re-election.

District 37
Incumbent Democrat Minority Leader Jon Sesso has represented the 37th district since 2013.

District 38
Incumbent Democrat Jim Keane has represented the 38th district since 2009. Keane was term-limited and he successfully ran for the Montana house. State representative Edith McClafferty won the open seat.

District 39
Incumbent Democrat Gene Vuckovich has represented the 39th district since 2011.

District 40
Incumbent Democrat Christine Kaufmann has represented the 40th district since 2007. Kaufmann was term-limited and couldn't seek re-election.

District 44
Incumbent Republican Majority Leader Fred Thomas has represented the 44th district since 2013.

District 45
Incumbent Democrat Dick Barrett has represented the 45th district and its predecessors since 2013.

District 46
Incumbent Democrat Sue Malek has represented the 46th district since 2013.

District 47
Incumbent Democrat Cliff Larsen has represented the 47th district since 2009. Larsen was term-limited and couldn't seek re-election. Republican state representative Dan Salomon won the open seat.

References

2016 Montana elections
Montana Senate
November 2016 events in the United States
Montana Senate elections